Santana World (stylized as #SantanaWorld) is the only mixtape by American rapper Tay-K. It was released on July 29, 2017, by 88 Classic and RCA Records. The mixtape originally features guest appearances from American rappers Diego Money and Bandman Fari, with rappers 21 Savage, Young Nudy and Maxo Kream later being added. It was released after his 2017 arrest. The mixtape was then reissued as Santana World (+) (stylized as #SantanaWorld (+)) on December 14, 2017, as a deluxe edition with two remixes, "The Race (Remix)" and "I <3 My Choppa (Remix)", with the former being released as a single. The album peaked at 128 on the US Billboard 200.

Track listing

Charts

References

2017 mixtape albums
Tay-K albums
RCA Records albums